The 1906 Wisconsin gubernatorial election was held on November 6, 1906.

Incumbent Republican Governor James O. Davidson won re-election, defeating Democratic nominee John A. Aylward and Socialist nominee Winfield R. Gaylord, with 57.39% of the vote.

Primary elections
Primary elections were held on September 4, 1906.

Democratic primary

Candidates
John A. Aylward, Democratic nominee for Wisconsin's 2nd congressional district in 1900
Ernst Merton, incumbent State Senator

Results

Republican primary

Candidates
James O. Davidson, incumbent Governor
Irvine Lenroot, incumbent Speaker of the Wisconsin State Assembly

Results

Socialist primary

Candidates
Winfield R. Gaylord, Socialist nominee for Wisconsin's 4th congressional district in 1904

Results

Prohibition primary

Candidates
Ephraim Llewellyn Eaton, Prohibition nominee for Wisconsin's 4th congressional district in 1892

Results

General election

Candidates
Major party candidates
James O. Davidson, Republican
John A. Aylward, Democratic

Other candidates
Ephraim Llewellyn Eaton, Prohibition
Winfield R. Gaylord, Socialist (Social-Democratic Party of Wisconsin)
Ole T. Rosaas, Socialist Labor

Results

References

Bibliography
  
 
 

1906
Wisconsin
Gubernatorial
November 1906 events